The  Association of Ethiopian Architects (AEA) is a professional organization for architects in Ethiopia. Headquartered in Addis Abeba, the AEA’s aim is to promote the advancement of architecture in the country, facilitate training and research and work on a holistic enhancement of related cultures and traditions. It also works for the advancement of professional etiquette.

The AEA is currently headed by Meskerem Tamiru as President and Tesfamariam Teshome as Vice-president.

History
The Association of Ethiopian Architects was founded in Addis Ababa in August 1991.

Organization

Structure
The Association's structure consists of President, Vice President, Secretary and four standing committee heads.

 Wendwosen Demrew (President)
 Amanuel Teshome Kebede (Vice- president)
 Brook Tefera Belay (Secretary)
 Bisrat Kifle Woldeyessus (Head of Professional Advancement and Popularization Chair )
 Timint Eshetu Yehdego ( Treasurer & Exhibition & Competition Chair Head )
 Helawi Sewnet ( Head of Publications Committee )
 Tewedaj Eshetu ( Vice -Secretary & Ethics Committee Chair Head )

Service
The association, beside promoting the enhancement of the profession, strives to bridge gaps among related professionals and create links between private and governmental institutions.

The association consists of four standing committees:

The Publications standing committee
The Exhibitions and Competitions standing committee
The Professional Advancement standing committee
The Ethics standing committees

Professionalism
The AEA provides its members with opportunities for career advancement, engages in active lobbying in building standards and laws, and oversees laws and conduct of professionals.  It administers design competitions, ratifies documents that are the model for the construction industry, and provides professional and design information services.

Public education
The AEA attempts to meet the needs and interests of the nation's architects and the public by raising public awareness of the value of architecture and the importance of good design. In doing so, the AEA  organizes annual conventions, workshops, lectures and public exhibitions.

Honors and awards

The AEA also recognizes professionals who make a distinguished contribution to the profession.

Presidents
The following people served as presidents:
Addis Mebratu 
Wendwosen Demrew

External links
 Association of Ethiopian Architects official website

References

Professional associations based in Ethiopia
Organizations established in 1991
Architecture-related professional associations